Valeri Tsyganenko (born 21 July 1981) is a Belarusian professional football coach and former player. Currently, he works at Isloch Minsk Raion as a youth coach.

References

External links
 
 Profile at teams.by
 

1981 births
Living people
Belarusian footballers
Belarusian expatriate footballers
Expatriate footballers in Finland
Expatriate footballers in Lithuania
Expatriate footballers in Armenia
Expatriate footballers in Kyrgyzstan
Expatriate footballers in Tajikistan
FC Traktor Minsk players
FC Kommunalnik Slonim players
FC ZLiN Gomel players
FC Lida players
FC SKVICH Minsk players
FC Ararat Yerevan players
FC Abdysh-Ata Kant players
FC Rechitsa-2014 players
FC Isloch Minsk Raion players
FC Šiauliai players
TP-47 players
Association football midfielders
Tajikistan Higher League players
Veikkausliiga players